Woman Hungry is a 1931 American pre-Code Western film with music photographed entirely in Technicolor. The film was based on the play The Great Divide (from 1906) which was written by William Vaughn Moody. The story was filmed as a silent film by MGM as The Great Divide (1925) and as an early silent/sound hybrid by First National also called The Great Divide (1929).

Cast
Sidney Blackmer as Geoffrey Brand
Lila Lee as Judith Temple
Raymond Hatton as Joac
Fred Kohler as Kampen
Kenneth Thomson as Leonard Temple
Olive Tell as Betty Temple
David Newell as Dr. Neil Cranford
Tom Dugan as Same Beeman
Blanche Friderici as Mrs. Temple
J. Farrell MacDonald as Buzzard

See also
List of early color feature films

References

External links

1930s color films
1930s Western (genre) musical films
American Western (genre) musical films
1930s English-language films
American films based on plays
Films directed by Clarence G. Badger
Films shot in Lone Pine, California
First National Pictures films
Early color films
1930s American films